Kim Jae-Gang (born August 16, 1987) is a South Korean heavyweight freestyle wrestler. He won a bronze medal at the 2018 Asian Games and a gold medal at the 2013 Asian Championships. Kim has a degree in physical education from the Yeungnam University. In 2014 he was named the Best Athlete of the Year by the Gyeongsangbuk-do Sports Council in Republic of Korea.

At the 2008 Summer Olympics, Kim competed in the 120 kg division. He received a bye for the preliminary round of sixteen match, before losing out to Marid Mutalimov, who was able to score three points in two straight periods, leaving Kim with a single point.

References

External links

NBC 2008 Olympics profile

1987 births
Living people
Olympic wrestlers of South Korea
Wrestlers at the 2010 Asian Games
Wrestlers at the 2008 Summer Olympics
South Korean male sport wrestlers
Wrestlers at the 2018 Asian Games
Medalists at the 2018 Asian Games
Asian Games medalists in wrestling
Asian Games bronze medalists for South Korea
Asian Wrestling Championships medalists
21st-century South Korean people